In physics and mathematics, the phase of a periodic function  of some real variable  (such as time) is an angle-like quantity representing the fraction of the cycle covered up to . It is denoted  and expressed in such a scale that it varies by one full turn as the variable  goes through each period (and  goes through each complete cycle).

(The cosine may be used instead of sine, depending on where one considers each period to start.)

The numeric value of the phase  depends on the arbitrary choice of the start of each period, and on the interval of angles that each period is to be mapped to. 

The term "phase" is also used when comparing a periodic function  with a shifted version  of it.

Mathematical definition 
Let  be a periodic signal (that is, a function of one real variable), and  be its period (that is, the smallest positive real number such that  for all ).

This concept can be visualized by imagining a clock with a hand that turns at constant speed, making a full turn every  seconds, and is pointing straight up at time .  The phase  is then the angle from the 12:00 position to the current position of the hand, at time , measured clockwise. 

For example, for a sinusoid, a convenient choice is any  where the function's value changes from zero to positive.

The phase expressed in degrees (from 0° to 360°, or from −180° to +180°) is defined the same way, except with "360°" in place of "2π".

Consequences
With any of the above definitions, the phase  of a periodic signal is periodic too, with the same period :
 for all . 

The phase is zero at the start of each period; that is
 for any integer .

In fact, every periodic signal  with a specific waveform can be expressed as 

where  is a "canonical" function of a phase angle in 

Adding and comparing phases
Since phases are angles, any whole full turns should usually be ignored when performing arithmetic operations on them. That is, the sum and difference of two phases (in degrees) should be computed by the formulas
 and 

respectively. Thus, for example, the sum of phase angles  is 30° (minus one full turn), and subtracting 50° from 30° gives a phase of 340° (plus one full turn).

Similar formulas hold for radians, with  instead of 360.

Phase shift  

At values of  when the difference is zero, the two signals are said to be in phase, otherwise they are out of phase with each other.

In the clock analogy, each signal is represented by a hand (or pointer) of the same clock, both turning at constant but possibly different speeds. The phase difference is then the angle between the two hands, measured clockwise.

The phase difference is particularly important when two signals are added together by a physical process, such as two periodic sound waves emitted by two sources and recorded together by a microphone. This is usually the case in linear systems, when the superposition principle holds.

For arguments  when the phase difference is zero, the two signals will have the same sign and will be reinforcing each other. One says that constructive interference is occurring.  At arguments  when the phases are different, the value of the sum depends on the waveform.

For sinusoids
For sinusoidal signals, when the phase difference  is 180° ( radians), one says that the phases are opposite, and that the signals are in antiphase.  Then the signals have opposite signs, and destructive interference occurs.  
Conversely, a phase reversal or phase inversion implies a 180-degree phase shift.

When the phase difference  is a quarter of turn (a right angle,  or ), sinusoidal signals are sometimes said to be in quadrature (e.g., in-phase and quadrature components).

If the frequencies are different, the phase difference  increases linearly with the argument .  The periodic changes from reinforcement and opposition cause a phenomenon called beating.

For shifted signals
The phase difference is especially important when comparing a periodic signal  with a shifted and possibly scaled version  of it. That is, suppose that  for some constants  and all . Suppose also that the origin for computing the phase of  has been shifted too. In the clock analogy, this situation corresponds to the two hands turning at the same speed, so that the angle between them is constant.

In this case, the phase shift is simply the argument shift , expressed as a fraction of the common period  (in terms of the modulo operation) of the two signals and then scaled to a full turn:

Therefore, when two periodic signals have the same frequency, they are always in phase, or always out of phase.  Physically, this situation commonly occurs, for many reasons.  For example, the two signals may be a periodic soundwave recorded by two microphones at separate locations. Or, conversely, they may be periodic soundwaves created by two separate speakers from the same electrical signal, and recorded by a single microphone.  They may be a radio signal that reaches the receiving antenna in a straight line, and a copy of it that was reflected off a large building nearby.  

A well-known example of phase difference is the length of shadows seen at different points of Earth.

For sinusoids with same frequency
For sinusoidal signals (and a few other waveforms, like square or symmetric triangular), a phase shift of 180° is equivalent to a phase shift of 0° with negation of the amplitude.  When two signals with these waveforms, same period, and opposite phases are added together, the sum  is either identically zero, or is a sinusoidal signal with the same period and phase, whose amplitude is the difference of the original amplitudes.

The phase shift of the co-sine function relative to the sine function is +90°.

 
A real-world example of a sonic phase difference occurs in the warble of a Native American flute. The amplitude of different harmonic components of same long-held note on the flute come into dominance at different points in the phase cycle.  The phase difference between the different harmonics can be observed on a spectrogram of the sound of a warbling flute.

Phase comparison
Phase comparison is a comparison of the phase of two waveforms, usually of the same nominal frequency. In time and frequency, the purpose of a phase comparison is generally to determine the frequency offset (difference between signal cycles) with respect to a reference.

A phase comparison can be made by connecting two signals to a two-channel oscilloscope. The oscilloscope will display two sine signals, as shown in the graphic to the right. In the adjacent image, the top sine signal is the test frequency, and the bottom sine signal represents a signal from the reference.

If the two frequencies were exactly the same, their phase relationship would not change and both would appear to be stationary on the oscilloscope display. Since the two frequencies are not exactly the same, the reference appears to be stationary and the test signal moves. By measuring the rate of motion of the test signal the offset between frequencies can be determined.

Vertical lines have been drawn through the points where each sine signal passes through zero. The bottom of the figure shows bars whose width represents the phase difference between the signals. In this case the phase difference is increasing, indicating that the test signal is lower in frequency than the reference.

Formula for phase of an oscillation or a periodic signal
The phase of an oscillation or signal refers to a sinusoidal function such as the following:

These signals are periodic with period , and they are identical except for a displacement of  along the  axis. The term phase can refer to several different things:
 In the context of communication waveforms, the time-variant angle , or its principal value, is referred to as instantaneous phase, often just phase.

See also 

 Absolute phase
 AC phase
 In-phase and quadrature components
 Instantaneous phase
 Lissajous curve
 Phase cancellation
 Phase problem
 Phase spectrum
 Phase velocity
 Phasor
 Polarization
 Coherence, the quality of a wave to display a well defined phase relationship in different regions of its domain of definition
 Hilbert Transform, A method of changing phase by 90°
 Reflection phase shift, A phase change that happens when a wave is reflected off of a boundary from fast medium to slow medium

References

External links

 "What is a phase?". Prof. Jeffrey Hass. "An Acoustics Primer", Section 8. Indiana University, 2003. See also: (pages 1 thru 3, 2013)
 Phase angle, phase difference, time delay, and frequency
 ECE 209: Sources of Phase Shift — Discusses the time-domain sources of phase shift in simple linear time-invariant circuits.
 Open Source Physics JavaScript HTML5 
 Phase Difference Java Applet

Wave mechanics
Physical quantities